The Contract Buyers League (CBL) was a grassroots organization formed in 1968 by residents of North Lawndale, a Chicago, Illinois community. Assisted by Jack Macnamara, a Jesuit seminarian, and twelve white college students based at Presentation Roman Catholic Church, led by Msgr. Jack Egan, the CBL fought the discriminatory real estate practice known as “contract selling.”

History 
Following World War II, Chicago’s South Side had become increasingly overcrowded as African Americans moved from the South in the second wave of the Great Migration. Unable to attain decent and sanitary housing in white neighborhoods because of racially restrictive real estate covenants and mortgage redlining by the Federal Housing Administration (FHA), African Americans were confined to the South Side ghetto.

They finally began to move into new neighborhoods. In the 1950s-60s, real estate speculators exploited white homeowners’ fears on the West Side of plummeting real estate values because of neighborhoods that had ethnic change. Realtors went door-to-door to persuade white homeowners to sell because blacks were moving into the neighborhood. In neighborhoods they wished to exploit, “panic-peddling” speculators hired black men to drive beat-up cars with the music blaring and paid black women to push their babies in strollers. Speculators made enormous profits by convincing whites to sell their homes at well-below market value and then reselling to blacks at much higher than market value. Black homebuyers were subject to a “race tax,” as a property would typically be bought from a white homeowner for $10,000 and resold a week later to a black family for $25,000.

The FHA’s refusal to lend to blacks meant that they could not buy overpriced homes except on contract, but the title to a property bought on contract would not be transferred to the buyer until all contract payments had been made. Trapped in overwhelming debt, contract buyers were charged exorbitant fees for repairs to correct building code violations, which speculators had concealed from them. In order to afford payments, contract buyers were forced to work two or three jobs, separating them from their families. Buyers who missed a single payment would be evicted with no right to recoup prior payments. Speculators would then resell the property to another black household under the same terms.

The process of “blockbusting” was a national phenomenon. But, the practice of contract selling reached its peak in North Lawndale, where an estimated 3,000 buildings were sold on contract. This contributed to the neighborhood’s population changing from 87% white in 1950 to 91% black in 1960.

Other entities 
Groups similar to the CBL formed in cities around the country to combat contract selling. The CBL was the most influential in winning justice for exploited black homebuyers. The CBL renegotiated 400 contracts for its members, saving residents an estimated $25,000,000. The FHA finally responded to pressure from the CBL by reforming its discriminatory underwriting policies in order to lend to blacks.

See also 
 Institutional racism
 Blockbusting
 Real estate covenants
 Redlining

References

Further reading 
 Satter, Beryl. Family Properties: Race, Real Estate, and the Exploitation of Black Urban America. New York, N.Y.: Metropolitan Books, 2009.  
 Coates, Ta-Nehisi. "The Case for Reparations" The Atlantic. June 2014. pp. 54–71.
 McPherson, James Alan. ""In My Father's House There Are Many Mansions - And I'm Going to Get Me Some of Them Too": The Story of the Contract Buyers League." The Atlantic. 1972. pp. 51–82.

External links 

 Contract Buyer's League interviews and meeting tapes at The Newberry

Housing
Discrimination in the United States
Community organizations
Organizations established in 1968
1968 establishments in Illinois
North Lawndale, Chicago